Buster's Spanish Rocketship is an album by Buster Poindexter, the alter ego of singer David Johansen. Following ...Rocketship, Johansen returned to recording albums under his real name.

The album was named after Buster's new backing band.

Critical reception
The Sun-Sentinel wrote: "Turning his slightly jaded eye toward salsa, merengue and the most broken Spanish ever spoken, Buster brings on the bongos and dancing girls." Tulsa World thought that "his voice is giving out, but his spicy reverie will always flip skirts up."

AllMusic wrote that "the Latin-tinged Buster's Spanish Rocketship is a minor triumph, demonstrating that David Johansen has an ear for material and a self-deprecating sense of humor that keeps Poindexter enjoyable."

Track listing
All tracks composed by David Johansen.
 "Ondine" – 2:55
 "Nueva Broadway (They Don't Smoke)" – 4:18
 "Downtown Dream" – 4:10
 "Inez (Is Just a Big Rage Queen)" – 4:13
 "The Closer I Get to Heaven" – 4:15
 "My First Sin" – 4:28
 "Let's Take It Easy" – 3:43
 "Linda Lee" – 3:41
 "Iris Chacon" – 3:43
 "Skin & Bones" – 3:36
 "Mean Spirited Sal" – 4:17
 "Lay Down" – 3:42
 "Rhumba (Dance Fever)" – 5:56

Personnel
Buster Poindexter – vocals
The Banshees of Blue
Soozie Tyrell – vocals
Richard Barone – vocals
Brian Koonin – guitar, cuatro
Jack Bashkow – saxophone, piccolo
Kenny Fradley – trumpet
Byron Stripling – trumpet
Mark Pender – trumpet
Conrad Herwig – trombone
Jimmy Bosch – trombone
Randy Andos – bass trombone
Charlie Giordano – accordion, piano
Andy Gonzales – bass
Brian Hamm – bass
Tony Machine – drums
Fred Walcott – percussion
Ismael "Bongo" Bruno – percussion
Mike Jacobson – percussion

References

1997 albums
Buster Poindexter albums
PolyGram albums